Southeastern Summer Theatre Institute (SSTI) is an annual summer theatre program located on the campus of Hilton Head High School, located in Hilton Head Island, South Carolina. The program was founded in the Summer of 2008 with the purpose of teaching theatre students the techniques required to be competitive in a professional theatrical environment.  SSTI trains students how to succeed in the difficult three-week rehearsal period that is standard in most professional theaters. At the conclusion of this three-week period, students open a fully produced musical. During the fourth week of SSTI, Broadway actors and musicians fly in to SSTI from NYC to work with the students in day-long workshops.

In 2011, the SSTI added a new Technical Theatre Intensive, in which students are offered detailed instruction in set design, lighting design, and sound design.  Students work alongside industry experts to design, model, and build the set for the summer's musical. In 2016, SSTI Junior was established as a week-long middle school intensive serving aspiring musical theatre students rising 6th through 8th grade.

Previous Summer Musicals
Fiddler On the Roof, 2008
Bye Bye Birdie, 2009
Les Misérables, 2010
Hairspray, 2011
Legally Blonde: The Musical, 2012
RENT, 2013
The Addams Family, 2014
Big Fish and Little Shop of Horrors, 2015
Catch Me If You Can and Pippin, 2016
Anything Goes and Young Frankenstein, 2017
Chicago and Tuck Everlasting, 2018
Cabaret and Bright Star, 2019
SSTI Online!, 2020
Hello, Dolly! and Crazy For You, 2021
The Music Man and Ragtime, 2022

References 
https://www.buzzfeed.com/educationaltheatre/top-summer-theater-camps-hws8

https://plus.google.com/b/117542393448720428123/117542393448720428123/posts

http://www.SummerTheatreInstitute.com

External links 
 

Education in South Carolina
Theatre in South Carolina
Musical theatre organizations